The 2016-17 Ukrainian Amateur Cup season was scheduled to start on August 31, 2016.

The cup holders FC Rochyn Sosnivka (Hirnyk) were defeated by FC ODEK Orzhiv in quarterfinals.

Participated clubs

 Chernihiv Oblast (3): Frunzivets Nizhyn, Avanhard Koryukivka, Yednist Plysky
 Chernivtsi Oblast: FSC Sloboda
 Ivano-Frankivsk Oblast: Oskar Pidhiria
 Kharkiv Oblast (2): Kolos Zachepylivka, Kvadro Pervomaisky
 Kherson Oblast: Kolos Khlibodarivka
 Khmelnytskyi Oblast: Sluch Starokostiantyniv
 Kyiv Oblast (2): Dzhuniors Shpytky, Chaika Petropavlivska Borshchahivka
 Kirovohrad Oblast: Nova Politsiya Kropyvnytskyi

 Lviv Oblast (5): FC Mykolaiv, FC Sambir, FC Lviv, SCC Demnya, Hirnyk Sosnivka
 Mykolaiv Oblast: FC Vradiyivka
 Rivne Oblast: Mayak Sarny, ODEK Orzhiv
 Sumy Oblast: Viktoriya Mykolayivka
 Ternopil Oblast: DSO-Podillia Ternopil Raion
 Vinnytsia Oblast (3): Fakel Lypovets, Patriot Kukavka, FC Bershad
 Zaporizhia Oblast: Tavria-Skif Rozdol
 Zhytomyr Oblast: MFC Zhytomyr

Competition schedule

Qualification round

|}

Byes: FC Hirnyk Sosnivka, FC Yednist Plysky, FC Vradiyivka, FC ODEK Orzhiv, and FC Chaika Kyiv-Sviatoshyn Raion.

Round of 16

|}

Quarterfinals

|}

Semifinals

|}

Final

|}

See also
 2016–17 Ukrainian Football Amateur League

References

External links
 Official website of the Football Amateur Association

Ukrainian Amateur Cup
Ukrainian Amateur Cup
Amateur Cup